Nothocissus is a plant genus in the family Vitaceae.

Note: Nothocissus and Pterisanthes are reported to be unresolved names by the Plant List and hence should contain no data until they are either authoritatively accepted as legitimate or shown to be synonyms.

References

External links
 

 

Vitaceae
Vitaceae genera